The 2011–12 Denver Nuggets season was the 45th season of the franchise, and its 36th season in the National Basketball Association (NBA). Denver finished the lockout-shortened season in sixth place in the Western Conference with a 38–28 record and were eliminated in the first round of the 2012 NBA Playoffs by the Los Angeles Lakers in seven games. The Nuggets finished the regular season leading the league in points per game (104.12) and assists per game (23.96).

Key dates
 June 23: The 2011 NBA draft took place at Prudential Center in Newark, New Jersey. With the 22nd overall pick in the draft, the Nuggets selected Kenneth Faried from Morhead State.

Draft

Roster

Regular season

Standings

Record vs. opponents

Game log

|- bgcolor="#ccffcc"
| 1
| December 26
| @ Dallas
| 
| Ty Lawson (27)
| Danilo GallinariNenê(7)
| Andre Miller (5)
| American Airlines Center20,408
| 1–0
|- bgcolor="#ccffcc"
| 2
| December 28
| Utah
| 
| Nenê (25)
| Al HarringtonNenê(7)
| Andre Miller (12)
| Pepsi Center19,155
| 2–0
|- bgcolor="#ffcccc"
| 3
| December 29
| @ Portland
| 
| Ty Lawson (25)
| Nenê (9)
| Andre Miller (8)
| Rose Garden20,531
| 2–1
|- bgcolor="#ffcccc"
| 4
| December 31
| @ L. A. Lakers
| 
| Al Harrington (21)
| Timofey Mozgov (10)
| Ty Lawson (8)
| Staples Center18,997
| 2–2

|- bgcolor="#ccffcc"
| 5
| January 1
| L. A. Lakers
| 
| Danilo Gallinari (20)
| Al Harrington (11)
| Ty Lawson (10)
| Pepsi Center19,155
| 3–2
|- bgcolor="#ccffcc"
| 6
| January 2
| Milwaukee
| 
| Danilo Gallinari (21)
| Danilo Gallinari (10)
| Ty Lawson (6)
| Pepsi Center14,142
| 4–2
|- bgcolor="#ccffcc"
| 7
| January 4
| Sacramento
| 
| Al Harrington (15)
| Kosta Koufos (10)
| Rudy Fernández (8)
| Pepsi Center14,562
| 5–2
|- bgcolor="#ccffcc"
| 8
| January 6
| @ New Orleans
| 
| Danilo Gallinari (23)
| Nenê (8)
| Ty Lawson (8)
| New Orleans Arena13,035
| 6–2
|- bgcolor="#ffcccc"
| 9
| January 7
| @ San Antonio
| 
| Danilo Gallinari (31)
| Andre Miller (6)
| Ty Lawson (10)
| AT&T Center17,537
| 6–3
|- bgcolor="#ffcccc"
| 10
| January 9
| New Orleans
| 
| Danilo GallinariTy Lawson (15)
| Nenê (11)
| Nenê (4)
| Pepsi Center14,002
| 6–4
|- bgcolor="#ccffcc"
| 11
| January 11
| New Jersey
| 
| Danilo Gallinari (22)
| Nenê (9)
| Andre Miller (12)
| Pepsi Center14,139
| 7–4
|- bgcolor="#ccffcc"
| 12
| January 13
| Miami
| 
| Ty Lawson (24)
| Nenê (12)
| Ty Lawson (9)
| Pepsi Center19,155
| 8–4
|- bgcolor="#ffcccc"
| 13
| January 15
| Utah
| 
| NenêDanilo Gallinari (18)
| Al Harrington (7)
| Ty Lawson (8)
| Pepsi Center16,208
| 8–5
|- bgcolor="#ccffcc"
| 14
| January 17
| @ Milwaukee
| 
| Corey Brewer (22)
| Nenê (9)
| Andre Miller (11)
| Bradley Center11,322
| 9–5
|- bgcolor="#ccffcc"
| 15
| January 18
| @ Philadelphia
| 
| Andre Miller (28)
| Nenê (14)
| Andre Miller (10)
| Wells Fargo Center15,201
| 10–5
|- bgcolor="#ccffcc"
| 16
| January 20
| @ Washington
| 
| Al Harrington (29)
| Ty Lawson (9)
| Ty Lawson (7)
| Verizon Center14,866
| 11–5
|- bgcolor="#ccffcc"
| 17
| January 21
| @ New York
| 
| Danilo Gallinari (37)
| Nenê (13)
| Andre Miller (12)
| Madison Square Garden19,763
| 12–5
|- bgcolor="#ccffcc"
| 18
| January 25
| @ Sacramento
| 
| Danilo Gallinari (23)
| Kosta Koufos (7)
| Andre Miller (10)
| Power Balance Pavilion12,097
| 13–5
|- bgcolor="#ccffcc"
| 19
| January 27
| Toronto
| 
| Rudy Fernández (23)
| Nenê (10)
| Andre Miller (12)
| Pepsi Center18,855
| 14–5
|- bgcolor="#ffcccc"
| 20
| January 29
| L. A. Clippers
| 
| Nenê (18)
| Nenê (9)
| Andre Miller (10)
| Pepsi Center19,495
| 14–6
|- bgcolor="#ffcccc"
| 21
| January 31
| @ Memphis
| 
| Al Harrington (23)
| Al Harrington (10)
| Andre Miller (6)
| FedEx Forum13,651
| 14–7

|- bgcolor="#ccffcc"
| 22
| February 2
| @ L. A. Clippers
| 
| Danilo Gallinari (21)
| Timofey Mozgov (7)
| Andre Miller (8)
| Staples Center19,223
| 15–7
|- bgcolor="#ffcccc"
| 23
| February 3
| L. A. Lakers
| 
| Al Harrington (24)
| Al Harrington (8)
| Ty LawsonAndre Miller (7)
| Pepsi Center19,155
| 15–8
|- bgcolor="#ffcccc"
| 24
| February 4
| @ Portland
| 
| Danilo Gallinari (20)
| Kosta Koufos (12)
| Ty Lawson (5)
| Rose Garden20,583
| 15–9
|- bgcolor="#ffcccc"
| 25
| February 6
| Houston
| 
| Rudy FernándezDanilo Gallinari (14)
| Al Harrington (15)
| Ty Lawson (7)
| Pepsi Center14,501
| 15–10
|- bgcolor="#ffcccc"
| 26
| February 8
| Dallas
| 
| Rudy FernándezAl Harrington (17)
| Nenê (10)
| Ty Lawson (10)
| Pepsi Center15,970
| 15–11
|- bgcolor="#ffcccc"
| 27
| February 9
| Golden State
| 
| Arron Afflalo (26)
| Kenneth Faried (10)
| Ty Lawson (10)
| Pepsi Center14,960
| 15–12
|- bgcolor="#ccffcc"
| 28
| February 11
| @ Indiana
| 
| Ty Lawson (27)
| Kosta Koufos (7)
| Andre Miller (4)
| Bankers Life Fieldhouse15,313
| 16–12
|- bgcolor="#ccffcc"
| 29
| February 14
| Phoenix
| 
| Arron Afflalo (20)
| Kenneth FariedKosta Koufos (9)
| Andre Miller (7)
| Pepsi Center17,873
| 17–12
|- bgcolor="#ffcccc"
| 30
| February 15
| @ Dallas
| 
| Rudy Fernández (14)
| Kosta Koufos (14)
| Corey BrewerJulyan Stone (4)
| American Airlines Center20,075
| 17–13
|- bgcolor="#ffcccc"
| 31
| February 17
| @ Memphis
| 
| Corey Brewer (26)
| Kenneth Faried (10)
| Andre Miller (9)
| Pepsi Center15,201
| 17–14
|- bgcolor="#ffcccc"
| 32
| February 19
| @ Oklahoma City
| 
| Arron Afflalo (27)
| Al Harrington (11)
| Andre Miller (10)
| Chesapeake Energy Arena18,203
| 17–15
|- bgcolor="#ccffcc"
| 33
| February 20
| Minnesota
| 
| Al Harrington (31)
| Kenneth Faried (14)
| Andre Miller (12)
| Pepsi Center17,263
| 18–15
|- bgcolor="#ffcccc"
| 34
| February 22
| @ L. A. Clippers
| 
| Arron Afflalo (20)
| Kenneth Faried (9)
| Andre Miller (8)
| Staples Center19,163
| 18–16
|- bgcolor="#ffcccc"
| 35
| February 23
| San Antonio
| 
| Corey Brewer (23)
| Jordan HamiltonAl Harrington (9)
| Andre MillerJulyan Stone (12)
| Pepsi Center18,875
| 18–17
|- bgcolor="#ccffcc"
| 36
| February 29
| Portland
| 
| Ty Lawson (18)
| Kosta Koufos (11)
| Ty Lawson (9)
| Pepsi Center15,715
| 19–17

|- bgcolor="#ccffcc"
| 37
| March 2
| @ Houston
| 
| Ty Lawson (22)
| Kenneth Faried (11)
| Ty Lawson (15)
| Toyota Center16,879
| 20–17
|- bgcolor="#ccffcc"
| 38
| March 4
| @ San Antonio
| 
| Ty Lawson (22)
| Ty Lawson (9)
| Ty Lawson (11)
| AT&T Center18,581
| 21–17
|- bgcolor="#ccffcc"
| 39
| March 5
| Sacramento
| 
| Arron Afflalo (32)
| Kenneth Faried (12)
| Ty Lawson (13)
| Pepsi Center14,823
| 22–17
|- bgcolor="#ffcccc"
| 40
| March 7
| Cleveland
| 
| Al Harrington (22)
| Kenneth Faried (9)
| Ty Lawson (6)
| Pepsi Center15,816
| 22–18
|- bgcolor="#ccffcc"
| 41
| March 9
| New Orleans
| 
| Arron Afflalo (28)
| Al Harrington (10)
| Ty Lawson (10)
| Pepsi Center19,155
| 23–18
|- bgcolor="#ffcccc"
| 42
| March 11
| Memphis
| 
| Three players (15)
| Chris AndersenNenê (9)
| Andre Miller (7)
| Pepsi Center17,737
| 23–19
|- bgcolor="#ccffcc"
| 43
| March 13
| Atlanta
| 
| Nenê (22)
| Kenneth Faried (9)
| Andre Miller (8)
| Pepsi Center15,594
| 24–19
|- bgcolor="#ffcccc"
| 44
| March 15
| Oklahoma City
| 
| Andre Miller (17)
| Kenneth Faried (9)
| Ty Lawson (5)
| Pepsi Center18,458
| 24–20
|- bgcolor="#ccffcc"
| 45
| March 17
| Boston
| 
| Danilo Gallinari (20)
| Kenneth Faried (16)
| Ty Lawson (10)
| Pepsi Center19,003
| 25–20
|- bgcolor="#ffcccc"
| 46
| March 19
| Dallas
| 
| Arron Afflalo (24)
| Al Harrington (9)
| Danilo Gallinari (7)
| Pepsi Center16,683
| 25–21
|- bgcolor="#ccffcc"
| 47
| March 21
| Detroit
| 
| Ty Lawson (25)
| Wilson Chandler (10
| Andre Miller (7)
| Pepsi Center16,681
| 26–21
|- bgcolor="#ffcccc"
| 48
| March 23
| @ Utah
| 
| Al Harrington (20)
| Al Harrington (10)
| Ty LawsonAndre Miller (6)
| EnergySolutions Arena19,250
| 26–22
|- bgcolor="#ffcccc"
| 49
| March 25
| @ Minnesota
| 
| Kenneth Faried (17)
| JaVale McGee (11)
| Wilson ChandlerTy Lawson (5)
| Target Center20,023
| 26–23
|- bgcolor="#ccffcc"
| 50
| March 26
| @ Chicago
| 
| Ty Lawson (27)
| Ty Lawson (9)
| Andre Miller (10)
| United Center22,274
| 27–23
|- bgcolor="#ffcccc"
| 51
| March 28
| @ Toronto
| 
| Ty Lawson (26)
| Wilson Chandler (8)
| Ty Lawson (9)
| Air Canada Centre15,867
| 27–24
|- bgcolor="#ccffcc"
| 52
| March 30
| @ Charlotte
| 
| Arron Afflalo (19)
| Arron AfflaloAl Harrington (11)
| Ty Lawson (10)
| Time Warner Cable Arena13,806
| 28–24

|- bgcolor="#ccffcc"
| 53
| April 1
| @ Orlando
| 
| Ty Lawson (25)
| Kenneth Faried (9)
| Ty Lawson (9)
| Amway Center18,846
| 29–24
|- bgcolor="#ffcccc"
| 54
| April 4
| @ New Orleans
| 
| Ty Lawson (22)
| Kenneth Faried (8)
| Arron Afflalo (7)
| New Orleans Arena15,020
| 29–25
|- bgcolor="#ccffcc"
| 55
| April 6
| Phoenix
| 
| Arron Afflalo (30)
| Kenneth FariedKosta Koufos (8)
| Ty Lawson (8)
| Pepsi Center19,155
| 30–25
|- bgcolor="#ffcccc"
| 56
| April 7
| @ Golden State
| 
| Ty Lawson (21)
| JaVale McGeeAndre Miller (6)
| Ty Lawson (6)
| Oracle Arena18,942
| 30–26
|- bgcolor="#ccffcc"
| 57
| April 9
| Golden State
| 
| Kenneth Faried (27)
| Kenneth Faried (17)
| Andre Miller (12)
| Pepsi Center15,530
| 31–26
|- bgcolor="#ccffcc"
| 58
| April 11
| Minnesota
| 
| Ty Lawson (24)
| Kenneth Faried (12)
| Ty Lawson (8)
| Pepsi Center15,823
| 32–26
|- bgcolor="#ffcccc"
| 59
| April 13
| @ L. A. Lakers
| 
| Andre Miller (20)
| JaVale McGee (10)
| Andre Miller (6)
| Staples Center18,997
| 32–27
|- bgcolor="#ccffcc"
| 60
| April 15
| Houston
| 
| Arron AfflaloTy Lawson (20)
| Kenneth Faried (11)
| Andre Miller (11)
| Pepsi Center17,954
| 33–27
|- bgcolor="#ccffcc"
| 61
| April 16
| @ Houston
| 
| Arron Afflalo (26)
| Al Harrington (9)
| Andre Miller (13)
| Toyota Center15,988
| 34–27
|- bgcolor="#ffcccc"
| 62
| April 18
| L. A. Clippers
| 
| Ty Lawson (24)
| Kosta Koufos (9)
| Andre Miller (8)
| Pepsi Center17,219
| 34–28
|- bgcolor="#ccffcc"
| 63
| April 21
| @ Phoenix
| 
| Ty Lawson (29)
| Kenneth Faried (14)
| Ty Lawson (10)
| US Airways Center15,877
| 35–28
|- bgcolor="#ccffcc"
| 64
| April 22
| Orlando
| 
| Danilo GallinariJaVale McGee (17)
| Kenneth Faried (10)
| Andre Miller (11)
| Pepsi Center19,155
| 36–28
|- bgcolor="#ccffcc"
| 65
| April 25
| @ Oklahoma City
| 
| Ty Lawson (25)
| Kenneth Faried (10)
| Andre Miller (6)
| Chesapeake Energy Arena18,203
| 37–28
|- bgcolor="#ccffcc"
| 66
| April 26
| @ Minnesota
| 
| JaVale McGee (19)
| Kosta Koufos (11)
| Andre Miller (10)
| Target Center14,824
| 38–28

Playoffs

|- bgcolor="#ffcccc"
| 1
| April 29
| @ L. A. Lakers
| 
| Danilo Gallinari (19)
| Andre Miller, Kenneth Faried (8)
| Andre Miller (7)
| Staples Center18,997
| 0–1
|- bgcolor="#ffcccc"
| 2
| May 1
| @ L. A. Lakers
| 
| Ty Lawson (25)
| Kenneth Faried (10)
| Andre Miller (8)
| Staples Center18,997
| 0–2
|- bgcolor="#ccffcc"
| 3
| May 4
| L. A. Lakers
| 
| Ty Lawson (25)
| JaVale McGee (15)
| Ty Lawson (7)
| Pepsi Center19,155
| 1–2
|- bgcolor="#ffcccc"
| 4
| May 6
| L. A. Lakers
| 
| Danilo Gallinari (20)
| Andre Miller, Kenneth Faried (7)
| Ty Lawson (6)
| Pepsi Center19,155
| 1–3
|- bgcolor="#ccffcc"
| 5
| May 8
| @ L. A. Lakers
| 
| Andre Miller (24)
| JaVale McGee (14)
| Ty Lawson, Andre Miller (8)
| Staples Center18,997
| 2–3
|- bgcolor="#ccffcc"
| 6
| May 10
| L. A. Lakers
| 
| Ty Lawson (32)
| Kenneth Faried (11)
| Arron Afflalo, Danilo Gallinari (7)
| Pepsi Center19,770
| 3–3
|- bgcolor="#ffcccc"
| 7
| May 12
| @ L. A. Lakers
| 
| Al Harrington, Ty Lawson (24)
| JaVale McGee (14)
| Andre Miller (8)
| Staples Center18,997
| 3–4

Player statistics

Regular season

|- align="center" bgcolor=""
| 
| 62 ||style=|62 || 33.6 || .471 ||style=|.398 || .798 || 3.2 || 2.4 || .6 || .2 || 15.2
|- align="center" bgcolor=""
| 
| 32 || 1 || 15.2 || .546 ||  || .610 || 4.6 || .2 || .6 || 1.4 || 5.3
|- align="center" bgcolor=""
| 
| 59 || 17 || 21.8 || .434 || .260 || .692 || 2.5 || 1.5 || 1.2 || .3 || 8.9
|- align="center" bgcolor=""
|  
| 4 || 0 || 5.3 ||style=|1.000 ||  ||  || .8 || .8 || .0 || .0 || 3.0
|- align="center" bgcolor=""
| 
| 8 || 6 || 26.9 || .392 || .250 || .833 || 5.1 || 2.1 || .8 || .8 || 9.4
|- align="center" bgcolor=""
| 
| 46 || 39 || 22.5 || .586 ||  || .665 ||style=|7.7 || .8 || .7 || 1.0 || 10.2
|- align="center" bgcolor=""
| 
| 31 || 1 || 22.9 || .440 || .328 || .698 || 2.1 || 2.4 || 1.0 || .1 || 8.6
|- align="center" bgcolor=""
| 
| 43 || 40 || 31.4 || .414 || .328 ||style=|.871 || 4.7 || 2.7 || 1.0 || .5 || 14.6
|- align="center" bgcolor=""
| 
| 26 || 2 || 9.9 || .432 || .362 || .400 || 2.4 || .8 || .2 || .1 || 4.4
|- align="center" bgcolor=""
| 
| 64 || 1 || 27.5 || .446 || .333 || .676 || 6.1 || 1.4 || .9 || .2 || 14.2
|- align="center" bgcolor=""
|  
| 28 || 27 || 29.5 || .509 || .000 || .677 || 7.4 || 2.2 ||style=|1.3 || .9 || 13.4
|- align="center" bgcolor=""
| 
| 48 || 24 || 16.5 || .599 ||  || .600 || 5.4 || .3 || .5 || .9 || 5.5
|- align="center" bgcolor=""
| 
| 61 || 61 ||style=|34.8 || .488 || .365 || .824 || 3.7 || 6.6 ||style=|1.3 || .1 ||style=|16.4
|- align="center" bgcolor=""
|  
| 20 || 5 || 20.6 || .612 ||  || .373 || 5.8 || .3 || .5 ||style=|1.6 || 10.3
|- align="center" bgcolor=""
| 
|style=|66 || 7 || 27.4 || .438 || .217 || .811 || 3.3 ||style=|6.7 || 1.0 || .1 || 9.7
|- align="center" bgcolor=""
| 
| 44 || 35 || 15.6 || .526 ||  || .684 || 4.1 || .5 || .3 || 1.0 || 5.4
|- align="center" bgcolor=""
| 
| 22 || 2 || 8.1 || .419 || .182 || .727 || 1.1 || 1.7 || .4 || .3 || 1.6
|}

 Statistics with the Denver Nuggets.

Playoffs

|- align="center" bgcolor=""
| 
| 7 || 7 || 32.7 || .405 || .200 || .800 || 3.6 || 2.7 || .7 || .3 || 10.9
|- align="center" bgcolor=""
| 
| 7 || 0 || 16.6 || .426 || .300 || .750 || 2.0 || .9 || 1.0 || .3 || 8.3
|- align="center" bgcolor=""
| 
| 7 || 7 || 27.4 || .533 ||  || .750 || 10.0 || .6 || .7 || 1.1 || 10.4
|- align="center" bgcolor=""
| 
| 7 || 7 || 31.7 || .362 || .174 || .917 || 5.1 || 2.4 || .7 || .6 || 13.4
|- align="center" bgcolor=""
| 
| 2 || 0 || 2.5 || .667 ||  ||  || .0 || .0 || .5 || .0 || 2.0
|- align="center" bgcolor=""
| 
| 7 || 0 || 23.3 || .320 || .286 || .667 || 4.3 || .9 || .4 || .1 || 9.7
|- align="center" bgcolor=""
| 
| 3 || 2 || 8.7 || .333 ||  ||  || 3.7 || .0 || .0 || .1 || .7
|- align="center" bgcolor=""
| 
| 7 || 7 || 34.6 || .514 || .321 || .632 || 2.6 || 6.0 || 1.0 || .1 || 19.0
|- align="center" bgcolor=""
| 
| 7 || 0 || 25.9 || .434 ||  || .538 || 9.6 || .7 || .7 || 3.1 || 8.6
|- align="center" bgcolor=""
| 
| 7 || 0 || 28.6 || .425 || .571 || .867 || 5.6 || 6.0 || 1.3 || .1 || 11.3
|- align="center" bgcolor=""
| 
| 7 || 5 || 14.1 || .480 ||  || .500 || 3.3 || .4 || .3 || .9 || 4.0
|- align="center" bgcolor=""
| 
| 2 || 0 || 2.5 || .500 ||  ||  || .5 || 1.0 || .0 || .0 || 1.0
|}

Awards
 Ty Lawson was named Western Conference Player of the Week (February 27 – March 4).
 Kenneth Faried was named Western Conference Rookie of the Month for March and was selected to the NBA All-Rookie First Team.

Injuries and disciplinary actions
 Before the start of the postseason, Wilson Chandler had a labral tear in his hip and was out for the remainder of the season.
 Arron Afflalo earned a 1-game suspension for throwing an elbow at an opponent during a game against the Utah Jazz on March 23.

Transactions

Overview

Trades

Free agents

Many players signed with teams from other leagues due to the 2011 NBA lockout. FIBA allows players under NBA contracts to sign and play for teams from other leagues if the contracts have opt-out clauses that allow the players to return to the NBA if the lockout ends. The Chinese Basketball Association, however, only allows its clubs to sign foreign free agents who could play for at least the entire season.

References

Denver Nuggets seasons
Denver Nuggets
Denver Nuggets
Denver Nuggets